Arman Chilmanov (born 20 April 1984) is a Kazakhstani Taekwondo athlete.

2008 Olympics 

Chilmanov was the other competitor in the controversial +80 kg bronze medal match against Ángel Matos of Cuba.

He was behind 3-2 in the second round when his opponent sustained an injury to his toe. Matos took a Kyeshi - one minute of injury recovery time - but Chilmanov was declared the winner of the bout when the Cuban's timeout expired. After a brief argument, Matos kicked referee Chakir Chelbat in the face, punched a judge in the arm and spat on the floor of the arena before being escorted out by security, and was subsequently banned for life, along with his coach Leudin González. After the chaos, he commented "To me it was obvious he (Matos) couldn't continue, the toe on his left foot was broken. Rules are rules, I'm happy with my medal".

References

External links
 
 

1984 births
Living people
Kazakhstani male taekwondo practitioners
Olympic taekwondo practitioners of Kazakhstan
Olympic bronze medalists for Kazakhstan
Taekwondo practitioners at the 2008 Summer Olympics
Asian Games medalists in taekwondo
Olympic medalists in taekwondo
Taekwondo practitioners at the 2002 Asian Games
Taekwondo practitioners at the 2006 Asian Games
Taekwondo practitioners at the 2010 Asian Games
Medalists at the 2008 Summer Olympics
Asian Games bronze medalists for Kazakhstan
Medalists at the 2002 Asian Games
Medalists at the 2006 Asian Games
Medalists at the 2010 Asian Games
World Taekwondo Championships medalists
Asian Taekwondo Championships medalists
21st-century Kazakhstani people